The 1896 Scottish Cup Final was played on 14 March 1896 at New Logie Green in Edinburgh and was the final of the 23rd season of the Scottish Cup. The Edinburgh derby rivals Hearts and Hibernian contested the match. Hearts won the match 3–1, thanks to goals from Davie Baird (penalty kick), Alex King and Willie Michael. Jo O'Neill scored a consolation goal for Hibs.

It is the only Scottish Cup Final to have been played outside the city of Glasgow. Logie Green was then the home ground of another Edinburgh club, St Bernard's.

Final

Teams

References

External links
 RSSSF: Scottish Cup 1895–96
 Scottish Football Archive
SFA Cup Archive

1896
Cup Final
Heart of Midlothian F.C. matches
Hibernian F.C. matches
1890s in Edinburgh